Coal dust is a fine powdered form of which is created by the crushing, grinding, or pulverizing of coal. Because of the brittle nature of coal, coal dust can be created during mining, transportation, or by mechanically handling coal. It is a form of fugitive dust.

Grinding coal to dust before combusting it improves the speed and efficiency of burning and makes the coal easier to handle. However, coal dust is hazardous to workers if it is suspended in air outside the controlled environment of grinding and combustion equipment. It poses the acute hazard of forming an explosive mixture in air and the chronic hazard of causing pulmonary illness in people who inhale excessive quantities of it.

The distribution of the particle-size of coal dust is frequently measured in mesh. The British slang term for cheap fuel consisting of coal dust (slack) containing small lumps of coal (nuts) is nutty slack.

Risks
The Occupational Safety and Health Administration (OSHA) has set the legal limit (Permissible exposure limit) for coal dust exposure in the workplace as 2.4 mg/m3 (5% SiO2) over an 8-hour workday. The National Institute for Occupational Safety and Health (NIOSH) has set a Recommended exposure limit (REL) of 1 mg/m3 (measured by MSHA) or 0.9 mg/m3 (measured by ISO/CEN/ACGIH) over an 8-hour workday.

Explosions

Coal dust suspended in air is explosive—coal dust has far more surface area per unit weight than lumps of coal, and is more susceptible to spontaneous combustion. As a result, a nearly empty coal store is a greater explosion risk than a full one.  The main attempts at prevention include using safety lamps, adding stone dust coffers to mine galleries to dilute the coal dust, watering workings and ensuring efficient ventilation of all the workings.

Another means of preventing coal dust explosions is by placing rock dust in the mine, which is usually pulverized limestone dust, which absorbs thermal energy from the heated gasses.  Rock dusting has been used since the early 1900s, but there have been technological improvements since then.

The worst mining accidents in history have been caused by coal dust explosions, such as the disaster at Senghenydd in South Wales in 1913 in which 439 miners died, the Courrières mine disaster in Northern France which killed 1,099 miners in 1906, the Luisenthal Mine disaster in Germany, which claimed 299 lives in 1962, and the worst: the explosion at Benxihu Colliery, China, which killed 1,549 in 1942. Such accidents were usually initiated by firedamp ignitions, the shock wave of which raised coal dust from the floor of the mine galleries to make an explosive mixture. The problem was investigated by Michael Faraday and Charles Lyell at the colliery at Haswell County Durham of 1844, but their conclusions were ignored at the time.

Lung and skin problems
Coalworker's pneumoconiosis, or black lung disease, is caused by inhaling coal dust, typically dust produced in coal mining. Government agencies in the United States have set exposure limit guidelines for coal dust inhalation.

Energy generation
For use in thermal power plants, coal is ground into dust using a device called a powdered coal mill. The resulting product, called powdered coal or pulverized coal, is then generally used in a fossil fuel power plant for electricity generation. Pulverised coal is a significant dust explosion hazard, as large quantities are suspended in air for transfer from the mill to the power plant. Explosions have occurred when the flow drops and flames in the burning chamber pass back along the ductwork delivering fuel.

See also
 Coal burner
 Coal-water slurry fuel
 Pulverized coal-fired boiler

Notes

References

External links

Mining Topic: Explosion Prevention

Dust
Dust
Mine safety
Occupational diseases
Powders